The Hibernia Bank, headquartered in San Francisco, California, was founded in April 1859 as the Hibernia Savings and Loan Society. In 1892, the company built a Beaux-Arts headquarters at 1 Jones Street at the corner of McAllister and Market Streets, designed by Albert Pissis.  Slightly damaged in the 1906 earthquake and fire, it re-opened again just five weeks after the calamity; Pissis designed an addition to the building in 1908.

The bank left the building in 1985, and, after a brief period in which it was used by the San Francisco Police Department, the building was vacant for decades, until it was restored and renovated in 2016.  As of 2017, the building, re-branded as "The Hibernia", is being subdivided for leasing to tenants who need less than the building's overall  of space.

The Hibernia Bank Building is a designated San Francisco landmark.

Early history
The Hibernia Savings and Loan Society was founded in a small office at the corner of Jackson and Montgomery Streets although it soon moved to larger offices nearby

In 1892, the bank's new headquarters at 1 Jones Street, on the corner of McAllister and Market Streets, were completed; it was designed by Albert Pissis in the Beaux-Arts style and was referred to by San Franciscans as "The Paragon".  In a poll of 20 artists made by the San Francisco Call shortly after the building was completed, 14 of the artists voted for the new building as the "best" in San Francisco; the next building (the Mills Building) received only 4 votes.  Pissis also designed an expansion of the building, which was completed in 1908.

The building largely survived the 1906 earthquake and fire, taking some damage from the fire.  It was one of the first buildings to be restored afterwards, re-opening on May 25, 1906, just five weeks later.

Later history
The building was designated an official San Francisco Landmark on August 2, 1981.

The Hibernia Savings and Loan Society left the building in 1985 and was acquired by Security Pacific Bank in 1988. Security Pacific Bank itself was acquired by Bank of America in 1992.

The building at 1 Jones Street was used by the San Francisco Police Department beginning in the 1990's as the location for their Tenderloin Task Force until 2000 when the Tenderloin Police Station was completed.  The building was then purchased by an out-of-town investor. Eight years later, with the building vacant, it was bought by a local real estate investor for $3.95 million, despite the attempts of a consortium of organizations to create a cultural arts center there, including museums dedicated to radio and music. The new owner spent some time looking for a single tenant for the building's  of space, but it remained vacant.  By 2013. the building was marred by graffiti and the sidewalk in front of it was often the site of drug sales and public urination, but in early 2016, the building received a $15 million renovation and restoration, along with earthquake-retrofitting.

On May 26, 2016, Presidential candidate Hillary Clinton held a fund-raising event in the renovated building.

In 2017, not having found a tenant who would take the entire building, the building was re-branded as "One Jones" and began to be subdivided for tenants needing smaller amounts of space.  The successful redevelopment of the building is seen as important for the revitalization of the Tenderloin as a neighborhood.

In April 2021, Dolmen Property Group, the building's owner and operator — re-conceptualized the building as a full-time meeting and event space — securing two liquor licenses and the management services of veteran San Francisco hospitality executive Philip Spiegel.

Other history
In 1974, a branch of the Hibernia Bank in San Francisco's Sunset District was robbed by the Symbionese Liberation Army and Patty Hearst.

See also

List of San Francisco Designated Landmarks
Hibernia Bank Building (New Orleans), built in 1921 as headquarters for the unrelated Hibernia National Bank

References

External links

https://www.thehiberniasf.com

Bank buildings in California
Companies based in San Francisco
Defunct companies based in the San Francisco Bay Area
Banks established in 1859
1859 establishments in California
San Francisco Designated Landmarks